|}

The Betway Handicap Chase is a National Hunt Grade 3 handicap chase in Great Britain which is open to horses aged five years or older. 
It is run at Aintree over a distance of about 3 miles and 1 furlong (3 miles and 210 yards, or 5,020 metres), and during its running there are 19 fences to be jumped. It is scheduled to take place each year at the Grand National meeting in April.

The race was raised from Listed to Grade Three status from 2018.

Records
Most successful horse (2 wins):
 Duke of Lucca – 2014,2015

Leading jockey (4 wins):
 Richard Johnson - From Dawn To Dusk (2010), Duke of Lucca (2014, 2015), Thomas Patrick (2018)

Leading trainer (4 wins):
 Jonjo O'Neill - Radiation (2000), Carbury Cross (2002), Master Tern (2003), Don't Push It (2009)

Winners since 1988

See also
 Horse racing in Great Britain
 List of British National Hunt races

References

Racing Post:

National Hunt races in Great Britain
National Hunt chases
Aintree Racecourse